Reinventing the Wheel is the 20th studio album by American country band Asleep at the Wheel. Recorded at Bismeaux Studio in Austin, Texas, it was produced by the band with manager/engineer Sam Seifert and released on November 14, 2006 by Ray Benson's record label Bismeaux Productions. The release is the band's first studio album to feature steel guitarist Eddie Rivers and vocalist Elizabeth McQueen, as well as the last to feature pianist John Michael Whitby as an official member.

Although it didn't chart, Reinventing the Wheel received positive reviews from a number of critics. Several commentators praised the presence of three lead vocalists in Benson, McQueen and fiddler Jason Roberts, which they likened to the group's early material featuring co-vocalists Chris O'Connell and LeRoy Preston. The album features appearances from four guest artists, each on one track – the Blind Boys of Alabama, James Rabitoy, Rolf Sieker, and the band's former pianist Floyd Domino.

Background
Reinventing the Wheel is Asleep at the Wheel's first album to feature a female co-lead vocalist since Chris O'Connell's departure in 1986, following the release of Pasture Prime. Reviewing the album for Vintage Guitar magazine, Dan Forte explained that on the collection, "the group reclaims its multi-pronged, three-vocalist approach, with Elizabeth McQueen and fiddle prodigy Jason Roberts getting almost as much face time as [frontman Ray] Benson", which he highlights as a strength of the release. At the time of its release, McQueen described Reinventing the Wheel as a reflection of the band's original vision, commenting that "It's come full circle ... and it's back to that original review concept of Asleep at the Wheel, with lots of different styles of music and different singers trading off."

Reception

Critical response to Reinventing the Wheel was positive. Reviewing the album for AllMusic, Thom Jurek described it as "a fine effort," writing that "This band may be an institution, but they still have inspiration, chops, and hardcore swing in spades to dish out to listeners." Vintage Guitar writer Dan Forte suggested that "Not every choice hits its mark", but proclaimed that "This Wheel is still rolling strong." In a review for radio station WYCE, Gregg Saur wrote that "After only one listen to this disc you will discover that this band brings as much fun, swing, boogie-woogie and old time western sounds as any disc of their 38 year career."

Ray Benson won the Austin Chronicle Austin Music Award for Best Record Producer in 2007 for his work on Reinventing the Wheel. The album itself was nominated for Album of the Year, but lost out to Brotherhood by Del Castillo.

Track listing

Personnel

Asleep at the Wheel
Ray Benson – lead and backing vocals, guitars, production, liner notes
Elizabeth McQueen – lead and backing vocals, production
Eddie Rivers – steel guitar, saxophone, production
David Miller – bass, backing vocals, production
John Michael Whitby – piano, backing vocals, production
David Sanger – drums, percussion, production
Jason Roberts – fiddle, electric mandolin, guitars, backing and lead vocals, production
Guest musicians
The Blind Boys of Alabama – vocals 
James Rabitoy – percussion 
Rolf Sieker – banjo 
Floyd Domino – piano 

Additional personnel
Sam Seifert – production, engineering
Dan Skarbek – production assistance
Bridget Bauer – production assistance
Cris Burns – additional engineering
Will Armstrong – additional engineering
Mike Mercer – additional engineering
Hank Williams – mastering
Dick Reeves – art direction, design
Helen Pryor – art direction, design
Scrojo – cover illustration
Ed Verosky – photography
Brio Yiapan – additional photography

References

External links

Asleep at the Wheel albums
2006 albums